Fatty Bear's Birthday Surprise is a 1993 adventure video game developed by Humongous Entertainment. It is the second game by Humongous Entertainment, the first being Putt-Putt Joins the Parade. It is also the first and only installment of the Fatty Bear point-and-click games, although the character was also used in the mini-game compilations Fatty Bear's Fun Pack and the crossover spin-off Putt-Putt & Fatty Bear's Activity Pack. In July 2013, Tommo bought the Fatty Bear license for the Atari bankruptcy proceedings.

Plot
A girl named Kayla falls asleep the night before her birthday. While she sleeps, her toys and stuffed animals come to life to prepare for her party. Fatty Bear searches through the house looking for ingredients with which to bake a cake. Unfortunately, it is not as easy as Fatty Bear thoughthe had planned on baking the cake, but in the kitchen was a mysterious package. When he curiously inspects it, a small brown puppy pops out of it and promptly runs away, tearing the ribbon on the box; Fatty Bear now has to return the puppy into the box, make a cake and get the house decorated for the birthday party.

Fatty Bear helps a doll named Gretchen set up for Kayla's party by blowing balloons in her bedroom and finding the letters for a "Happy Birthday" sign that the puppy ran off with. In the kitchen, the ingredients he found are used to bake a cake with the assistance of Matilda Rabbit. Then, using a bone and a ribbon he found, he lures the puppy back into her present box and wraps the box back up. Finally, Fatty Bear jumps into Kayla's bed, going back to stuffed animal form before she wakes up. The next morning, Kayla awakens and announces that her room is beautiful. Her father comes to wish her a happy birthday and deliver her surprise, which turns out to be the puppy that rushes into the room and leaps onto her bed. Kayla thanks Fatty Bear for the best birthday she has ever had, giving him a big hug. Fatty Bear winks at the player and the credits roll.

Reception

Electronic Gaming Monthly gave the 3DO version a 7.2 out of 10, saying that it is very similar to the Putt-Putt games, but that, given the choice between the two games, gamers should get one of the Putt-Putt games instead. Computer Gaming World approved of the "delightful" PC version's interactivity and lack of need to complete the game, describing it as "a wonderful introduction to the computer for beginning users and a delightful game for more experienced youngsters".

References

External links
 

1993 video games
Children's educational video games
Single-player video games
DOS games
Windows games
Adventure games
ScummVM-supported games
Humongous Entertainment games
Point-and-click adventure games
3DO Interactive Multiplayer games
Video games about bears
Fictional teddy bears
Video games about dogs
Video games about toys
Sentient toys in fiction
Video games about birthdays
Works about friendship
Video games developed in the United States
Tommo games